The 2021–22 Pakistan Cup was a List A cricket competition that took place in Pakistan in March and April 2022. In February 2022, the Pakistan Cricket Board (PCB) confirmed the fixtures for the tournament. Khyber Pakhtunkhwa were the defending champions.

Following the conclusion of the group stage, Khyber Pakhtunkhwa, Balochistan, Sindh and Central Punjab all finished in the top four places to advance to the semi-finals of the tournament. In the first semi-final match, Khyber Pakhtunkhwa beat Central Punjab by six wickets to progress to the final. In the second semi-final, Balochistan beat Sindh by 13 runs to join Khyber Pakhtunkhwa in the tournament's final. In the final, Balochistan beat Khyber Pakhtunkhwa by eight wickets to win their first title.

Squads
On 26 February 2022, the PCB confirmed all the squads for the tournament.

Group stage

Points table

 Advanced to the semi-finals

Fixtures

Finals

References

External links
 Series home at ESPN Cricinfo

2022 in Pakistani cricket
2021–22